Lingyan Temple  (traditional Chinese: 靈巖寺, simplified Chinese: 灵岩寺, pinyin: Líng Yán Sì) may refer to:

 Lingyan Temple (Jinan), in Jinan, Shandong, China
 Yanshan Temple, in Fanshi County, Shanxi, China, formerly known as Lingyan Temple

See also
 Ling Yen Mountain Temple
 Lingyan Pavilion, in Chang'an, Shaanxi, China
 Lingyin Temple, near Hangzhou, Zhejiang, China

Buddhist temple disambiguation pages